Zadok "Duki” Dror, (born 1963)  is an independent Israeli filmmaker whose films explore issues of migration, identity and displacement.

Biography
Zadok (Duki) Dror was born in Tel Aviv. In the early 1950s, Dror's parents fled from their native Iraq for the newly established state of Israel. When Dror's father was 17 he was arrested on charges of political activism and served five years in prison as a political prisoner. Upon his release, he was not allowed to stay in Iraq. After moving to Israel, the family changed their Arabic name, Darwish (Arabic for "wandering") to Dror (Hebrew for "freedom").

Dror studied in the United States at UCLA and is a graduate of Columbia College Chicago.

Filmmaking career
Dror's films are character-driven stories and deal with issues of identity, displacement and cross-cultural exchange.

His film Sentenced to Learn (1993), which tells the story of lifetime inmates in Illinois prisons, was screened in the Pompidou Center in Paris as part of an American Documentary retrospective. 

The story behind his parents' immigration to Israel and his father's story in particular is the central motif in Dror's personal film diary My Fantasia (2000) which takes place in the Dror's family-owned Menorah factory between the First and Second Gulf War. The history, culture and identity of Arab Jews has also informed a number of Dror's other work including Cafe Noah (1996), and Shadow in Baghdad (2013) about the disappearance of Baghdad's Jewish population and the story of Linda Menuhin's family.

In 2010, PBS aired a special series of his documentaries.

Awards and recognition
Raging Dove (2002), the story of Arab-Israeli world boxing champion Johar Lashin, which premiered at the SXSW Film Festival and won multiple awards, including Best Israeli Documentary in Docaviv. In 2006, Dror's film about the Vietnamese boat people who immigrated to Israel, The Journey of Vaan Nguyen, was the opening film at EBS Film Festival in Seoul and received the Remi Award at Houston Worldfest. In 2012, Dror's film on German-Jewish architect Erich Mendelsohn Mendelsohn's Incessant Visions received the Golden Award(FILAF d'Or) at the International Art Book and Film Festival (FILAF) in France. Partner with the Enemy (2014) the winner of the Golden Panda Award for long documentary at Sichuan Television Festival. Down The Deep, Dark Web (2016) – premiered in DOK Leipzig, nominated for the Ophir Award for Best Documentary under 60 minutes.

Filmography

Director
1993 Sentenced to Learn
1996 Radio Daze 
1997 Warp & Weft 
1997 Cafe Noah 
1998 Shenkin – A Street of Faith 
1998 Stress
1999 Taqasim
1999 Red Vibes
2000 Watchman
2001 My Fantasia
2002 Raging Dove
2004 Mr. Cortisone Happy Days
2005 The Journey of Van Nguyen
2007 SideWalk 
2009 Across the River
2011 Mendelsohn's Incessant Visions
2013 Shadow in Baghdad
2014 Partner with the Enemy
2016 Down the Deep, Dark Web
2017 Inside The Mossad (TV series)
2018 Inside The Mossad (The Movie)

Producer
2003 Paradise Lost
2004 Collaborators
2005 A General's Story
2012 Seekers
2013 Photonovela
2016 Praise the Lard

References

External links
 "You have to be on the move all the time" Interview with Duki Dror at Takriv Magazine
 Duki Dror at New York Times Archive
 
 Shadow in Baghdad: Israeli filmmaker Duki Dror chronicles extinction of Iraq’s Jewish community. Baltimore Examiner BY LARRY LUXNER · NOVEMBER 29, 2013
 35 Years on, where are Israel’s Vietnamese refugees? The Times of Israel, By Simona Weinglass September 20, 2015
 Review: 'Down the Deep Dark Web' is a movie every technologist should watch TechRepublic By Dan Patterson | July 13, 2016 The Dangers of the Deep Web – The Atlantic 4.8.2016
 The Dangers of the Deep Web The Atlantic 4.8.2016
 T alking With the Past: Architect Erich Mendelsohn on Screen GALO Magazine by Ross Ufberg February 7, 2012
 Incessant Visions: words from the life of Erich Mendelsohn  The Times of Israel By Rocco Giansante MAY 3, 2012
 FIFA 2012: Mendelsohn's Incessant Visions is a great film and not just for architecture buffs Montreal Gazette March 24, 2012
 Mendelsohn Building Spurs Monumental Dilemma Haaretz Keshet Rosenblum Dec 19, 2012
 ERICH MENDELSOHN – VISIONEN FÜR DIE EWIGKEIT – KRITIK DER FILMSTARTS-REDAKTION
 Shadow In Baghdad Official Film Website
 Zygote Films official website

Israeli film directors
1963 births
Living people
Film people from Tel Aviv
Columbia College Chicago alumni